The Presbyterian Church in Korea (BoSuHapDong II.) is a Reformed and Presbyterian denomination in South Korea.  It subscribes the Apostles Creed and Westminster Confession. In 2004 it had 101,400 members in 408 congregations and 456 ordained ministers in 17 Presbyteries and a General Assembly.

References

Presbyterian denominations in South Korea